Rafael Jordà Ruiz de Assin (born 1 January 1984) is a Spanish professional footballer who plays as a centre-forward.

Club career
Born in Santa Perpètua de Mogoda, Barcelona, Catalonia, Jordà finished his development with CD Numancia then made his senior debut with their reserves. He was subsequently loaned to Segunda División B club CM Peralta and, after appearing in three La Liga games with the former's first team towards the end of the 2004–05 season, the first being on 6 February 2005 as he featured the full 90 minutes in a 1–0 away loss against Getafe CF, was again loaned out to another side in the third level, Benidorm CF.

Jordà scored his first competitive goal for Numancia on 3 June 2007, heading a 26th-minute cross in a 3–1 home win over Polideportivo Ejido in the Segunda División. He contributed with six goals in 27 matches in the 2007–08 campaign, as the club from Soria returned to the top flight as champions.

In June 2008, news arose of Jordà signing for Alicante CF in division two and he eventually joined during that summer, switching to neighbouring Hércules CF at the end of the season, which ended in relegation. In late January 2010, after only three Copa del Rey appearances with the latter, he signed a two-year contract with Levante UD still in the second tier, netting in his debut two days later to help to a 2–1 league home defeat of Villarreal CF B; he repeated the feat in the following two rounds, at Cádiz CF (4–2 away win) and RC Celta de Vigo (1–0, home).

In March 2012, aged 28, Jordà moved abroad for the first time in his career, joining Chinese Super League side Guizhou Renhe F.C. and sharing teams with countrymen Nano and Rubén Suárez as the first two became the first Spaniards to play in the country. In the semi-finals of the Chinese FA Cup against Shandong Luneng Taishan FC, he scored once and provided an assist in an eventual qualification on the away goals rule.

After leaving in January 2014 as a free agent, Jordà represented in quick succession A.C. Siena, FC Dinamo Tbilisi and Wuhan Zall FC. On 4 August 2017, the 33-year-old signed for Indian Super League franchise Mumbai City FC from UE Llagostera.

Career statistics

Honours
Numancia
Segunda División: 2007–08

Guizhou Renhe
Chinese FA Cup: 2013

Notes

References

External links

Official website 

1984 births
Living people
People from Vallès Occidental
Sportspeople from the Province of Barcelona
Spanish footballers
Footballers from Catalonia
Association football forwards
La Liga players
Segunda División players
Segunda División B players
Tercera División players
CF Damm players
CD Numancia B players
CD Numancia players
Benidorm CF footballers
Alicante CF footballers
Hércules CF players
Levante UD footballers
UE Costa Brava players
Chinese Super League players
China League One players
Beijing Renhe F.C. players
Wuhan F.C. players
Serie B players
A.C.N. Siena 1904 players
Erovnuli Liga players
FC Dinamo Tbilisi players
Liga II players
FC Rapid București players
Indian Super League players
Mumbai City FC players
Catalonia international footballers
Spanish expatriate footballers
Expatriate footballers in China
Expatriate footballers in Italy
Expatriate footballers in Georgia (country)
Expatriate footballers in Romania
Expatriate footballers in India
Spanish expatriate sportspeople in China
Spanish expatriate sportspeople in Italy
Spanish expatriate sportspeople in Georgia (country)
Spanish expatriate sportspeople in Romania
Spanish expatriate sportspeople in India